Deansboro is a hamlet in Oneida County, New York, United States.

The Deansboro Railroad Station was listed on the National Register of Historic Places in 2002.

References

Hamlets in New York (state)
Hamlets in Oneida County, New York